Zanie may refer to the following places:
Zanie, Lublin Voivodeship (east Poland)
Zanie, Podlaskie Voivodeship (north-east Poland)
Zanie, Warmian-Masurian Voivodeship (north Poland)